The 3 Music Award is Ghanaian music awards ceremony held annually since 2018 to celebrate Ghanaian music. It was established by the 3Music Network with Media General TV3 as broadcasters. The Multimedia group became the media right holder in the second and subsequent edition. In 2020, the Fan fest which was scheduled to take place at the Accra Polo Grounds was cancelled and a Virtual award ceremony was held from the Fantasy Dome, Trade Fair La. This was because of the ban on public gathering due to the COVID-19 pandemic.

Categories 

 Artiste of the Year

 Song of the Year
 Male Act of the Year
 Female Act of the Year
 Group of the Year
 Breakout Act of the Year
 Album of the Year
 Viral Song of the Year
 Music video of the Year
 Reggae/Dancehall Act of the Year  
 Hiplife/Hop-Pop Act of the Year
 Hilife Act of the Year
 Gospel Act of the Year
 Best Collaboration of the Year 
 Best KwitStar
 DJ of the Year
 Fan Army of the Year
 African Act of the Year
 Best Ghanaian International Act of the Year
 Most Eventful Snapchat Channel
 Facebook Star of the Year
 Instagram Star of the Year
 Best Performers of the Year
 AfroBeat/AfroPop Song of the Year
 Producer of the Year

Not all categories were used in each year and some categories have been merged.

Song of the Year 
The Song of the year was the topmost award of the awards scheme from 2018 to 2020. It recognizes the vocal performer, the songwriter, producer, sound engineer and or mixer of the song. It is voted for by the 3Music board, academy and the general public.

Song of the Year Winners 

In 2021, the Artiste of the Year category was added eclipsing the song of the year as the topmost award of the awards scheme. KiDi was the inaugural winner.

Ceremonies 
The awards were launched in 

The inaugural ceremony in 2018 was held at the Fantasy Dome, Trade fair Site, La. From 2018 to 2020, the Fantasy Dome, Trade fair Site, La hosted the awards. From 2021 to 2022, the ceremonies were held at the Grand Arena, Accra International Conference Center in Accra.

2018: 1st 3Music Awards 
The first ceremony was held at the Fantasy Dome, Trade fair Site, La, on 24 March 2018. The ceremony was hosted Joselyn Dumas and D-Black.

2019: 2nd 3 Music Awards 
The second annual 3 Music awards was hosted by Lexis Bill and Cookie. The event was held on 30 March 2019 at the Fantasy Dome, Trade fair Site, La.

2020: 3rd 3 Music Awards 
The 3rd annual 3 Music Awards dubbed the "StayAtHome" edition was held on 2 May 2020 at the Fantasy Dome, Trade Fair site La. The event hosted by Jay Foley and Naa Ashorkor had no audience in attendance, this was in compliance with the National Directives on Public Gathering due to the COVID-19 pandemic.

2021: 4th 3 Music Awards 
The fourth annual 3 Music Award show was held on 27 March 2021 at the Accra International Conference Center. The event was hosted by broadcasters Jay Foley and Naa Ashorkor.

List of Winners

2022: 5th 3 Music Awards

See also 

 List Of Ghanaian Awards

References

External links 
 Official Facebook Page

International music awards
Ghanaian music awards
Awards established in 2018